Floyd R. Harrawood Jr. (September 8, 1929 – May 2, 2003) was a Canadian football player who played for the Winnipeg Blue Bombers and Calgary Stampeders. He played college football at the University of Tulsa.

References

1929 births
2003 deaths
Sportspeople from Kansas City, Kansas
Players of American football from Kansas
American football tackles
Tulsa Golden Hurricane football players
American players of Canadian football
Canadian football tackles
Calgary Stampeders players
Winnipeg Blue Bombers players